The Bismarck trumpet-eared bat (Kerivoula myrella), also known as the Manus Island woolly bat, is a species of vesper bat in the family Vespertilionidae.
It is found in subtropical or tropical dry forests.

Taxonomy
The Bismarck trumpet-eared bat was described as a new species in 1914 by British mammalogist Oldfield Thomas. The holotype had been collected on Manus Island, which is part of the Bismarck Archipelago.

Description
Overall, the Bismarck trumpet-eared bat is similar in appearance to Hardwicke's woolly bat.

Biology and ecology
It is an echolocating species with frequency modulation of its calls. The calls are broadband, with very slight curvature of the downward sweep of call frequencies. Its echolocation calls have low energy, meaning that it is unlikely to be detected by acoustic detectors unless it passes close to the device's microphone.

Range and habitat
It is found in Papua New Guinea, though its range may also include Indonesia.

Conservation
As of 2008, it is evaluated as a Vulnerable species by the IUCN. It meets the criteria for this designation regarding its population size, ecological requirements, and threats it may be facing.

References

Kerivoulinae
Bats of Oceania
Bats of Indonesia
Mammals of Papua New Guinea
Mammals of Western New Guinea
Bismarck Archipelago
Vulnerable fauna of Oceania
Taxonomy articles created by Polbot
Taxa named by Oldfield Thomas
Mammals described in 1914
Bats of New Guinea